Lloyd Llewellyn-Jones is a Welsh professor of ancient history, with a focus on ancient Iran, in particular the Achaemenid (550–330 BC) period. Before this, he specialized in the study of ancient Greece. Since 2016, he holds the Chair of Ancient History at Cardiff University. Prior to that, he served at the classics department of the University of Edinburgh, where in 2015, he became Professor of Ancient Greek and Iranian Studies.

Llewellyn-Jones is also the director of the Ancient Iran Program at the behest of the British Institute of Persian Studies. He regularly contributes to BBC History Magazine, History Today, and World History, among others. Llewellyn-Jones has authored numerous monographs, several books, and has edited and co-edited numerous works.

Selected bibliography
 Aphrodite's Tortoise: The Veiled Woman of Ancient Greece (2010)
 King and Court in Ancient Persia 559 to 331 BCE (2013)
 Designs on the Past: How Hollywood Created the Ancient World (2018)
 Persians: The Age of the Great Kings (2022)
 Ancient Persia and the Book of Esther: Achaemenid Court Culture in the Hebrew Bible (2023)

References

Living people
Academics of Cardiff University
Iranologists
Welsh historians
Classical scholars
Academics of the University of Edinburgh
Year of birth missing (living people)